Ficus variegata, common name the true fig shell, is a species of sea snail, a marine gastropod mollusk in the family Ficidae, the fig shells.

Description
The shell size varies between 45mm and 120mm

Distribution
This species occurs in the Indian Ocean off East Arabia and in the Pacific Ocean off Japan.

References
 Verhaeghe, M. & Poppe, G. T., 2000 A Conchological Iconography (3), The Family Ficidae page(s): 20

External links
 

Ficidae
Gastropods described in 1798